Mandy Lindsay is an American politician serving as a member of the Colorado House of Representatives from the 42nd district. She assumed office on January 18, 2022, succeeding Dominique Jackson.

Early life and education 
Lindsay is a native of Littleton, Colorado, and graduated from Chatfield High School. She studied political science at Tulane University.

Career 
Lindsay has worked as an independent political organizer in Colorado. She also served as State Representative Dominique Jackson's legislative aide and was employed at a rapid vaccination clinic. Lindsay was appointed to the Colorado House of Representatives in January 2022 after Jackson took a position in the United States Department of Housing and Urban Development.

In November 2022, Lindsay was selected to serve as the caucus chair for the state House majority.

References 

Living people
Democratic Party members of the Colorado House of Representatives
Women state legislators in Colorado
People from Aurora, Colorado
People from Littleton, Colorado
Year of birth missing (living people)